Vonnie B'VSean Miller (born March 26, 1989) is an American football outside linebacker for the Buffalo Bills of the National Football League (NFL). Miller played college football at Texas A&M, where he earned consensus All-American honors and the Butkus Award. He was selected by the Denver Broncos second overall in the 2011 NFL Draft.

Miller is an eight-time Pro Bowl selection, receiving first-team All-Pro honors three times and second-team All-Pro honors four times. As of 2022, he has the most career sacks of any active player, and the most career sacks in Denver Broncos history, at 110.5. At the conclusion of the 2015 NFL season, Miller was named Super Bowl MVP in Super Bowl 50. In 2021, Miller was traded to the Los Angeles Rams and was a member of the team that won Super Bowl LVI.

High school career
Miller was born on March 26, 1989, in Dallas. He attended DeSoto High School in DeSoto, Texas, where he played for the DeSoto Eagles high school football team and ran track. In his junior year, he recorded 37 tackles, 14 tackles for loss, 7 sacks, and 12 quarterback hurries. As a senior, he was named the District 8-5A Defensive MVP after making 76 tackles, 14 tackles for loss, and 6 sacks.  He played with future Aggie teammate Cyrus Gray.

In track and field, Miller competed in events such as the 110 m hurdles (personal record (PR) of 14.38 s), triple jump (PR of 12.65 m), and javelin throw (PR of 37.24 m).

Considered a four-star recruit by Rivals.com, Miller was listed as the number-15 weakside defensive end in the nation in 2007.  He chose Texas A&M over offers from Florida, LSU, Oklahoma, and Texas Tech.

College career
Miller attended Texas A&M University, where he played for the Texas A&M Aggies football team from 2007 to 2010.  As a freshman at defensive end in 2007, he was named Freshman All-Big 12 by The Sporting News after posting 22 tackles, including 10 solo stops. He recorded two sacks, four tackles for loss, and a forced fumble. He played in a 4-2-5 defense. He weighed 220 pounds during his freshman year.

In spring 2008, newly hired head coach Mike Sherman was discouraged by Miller's habits of skipping class and failing to produce during practice. Sherman decided to suspend Miller for that spring. Disappointed, Miller considered transferring, but upon his father's insistence, stayed. Miller then adopted a more serious attitude.

As a sophomore in 2008, Miller played at weakside linebacker under Joe Kines's 4–3 defense. He saw action in all 12 games, making 44 tackles, including 25 solo stops, and leading the team with 3.5 sacks. He made 7.5 tackles for loss, forced two fumbles, and recovered two more. His role was more confined to pass coverage, as opposed to rushing the quarterback, thus he was not able to showcase his pass-rushing abilities. In his final seven Big 12 games, he compiled just eight tackles.

As a junior in 2009, Miller adopted the role of the jack position, a defensive end/linebacker hybrid, which allowed him to use his pass-rushing abilities. He enjoyed a breakout season for the Aggies, leading the nation in sacks with 17 and ranking fourth in the nation with 21 tackles for loss. For his efforts, Von Miller was named first-team All Big-12 at defensive end and was named a first-team All-American by Sporting News and Sports Illustrated. He became the first Aggie to be named a first team All-American since Jason Webster in 1999. Then-Aggies defensive coordinator Joe Kines compared Miller to the late Derrick Thomas. Miller then studied and watched film of Thomas to familiarize himself with his game.

As a senior in 2010, Miller switched to playing as a 3–4 outside linebacker under Tim DeRuyter's defense. Early in the season, Miller suffered a high ankle sprain that held him back for the first six games. He posted 10.5 sacks and 17.5 tackles for loss. Again he made first-team All-Big 12 honors and won the Butkus Award as the nation's top linebacker. He was also named a consensus first-team All-American. He received first-team All-American honors from Walter Camp, Scout.com, Pro Football Weekly, ESPN.com and the Associated Press. Miller graduated with a degree in poultry science and raises chickens in his spare time.

Collegiate statistics

Professional career
Miller was projected to be a second-round pick in the 2010 NFL Draft had he passed on his senior season. He entered the 2011 NFL Draft regarded as one of the best 3–4 outside linebackers available by NFL draft experts and scouts and was projected to be a top five draft pick. At the 2011 Senior Bowl, Miller was the Defensive MVP. Among linebackers at the 2011 NFL Combine, Miller ranked second in the 40-yard dash, third in the vertical jump, first in the broad jump, third in the 20-yard shuttle, tied for first in the three-cone drill, and first in the 60-yard shuttle. His 11.15-second 60-yard shuttle broke the combine linebacker record. At the Texas A&M Pro Day in March 2011, Miller ran a 4.49-second 40-yard dash.

 

In March 2011, Miller was selected to represent top-flight rookies in the NFL Labor Union talks. He was persuaded by former NFL running back LaDainian Tomlinson to join the lawsuit. During the Texas A&M Pro Day, one scout compared him to Hall of Famer Derrick Thomas, while Bengals defensive coordinator Mike Zimmer compared him to Cardinals linebacker Joey Porter. NFL Network Analyst Mike Mayock, who rated Miller as the second-best player in the draft, stated that Miller reminded him of a smaller version of DeMarcus Ware. Miller's then-personal trainer, Dan Brandenburg, who also worked with first-round picks Clay Matthews III and Sean Weatherspoon, stated Miller is the best athlete of all three.

Denver Broncos 
Miller was drafted by the Denver Broncos second overall in the 2011 NFL Draft. He was the highest-selected linebacker since LaVar Arrington went number two to the Washington Redskins in 2000. He also became the Aggies' highest draft pick since Quentin Coryatt, who was selected second overall in 1992. The selection of Miller surprised certain experts. Denver was switching from a 3–4 defense to a 4–3, a defense which seemed counterintuitive to Miller's strengths. Former Broncos quarterback John Elway, who is also the executive vice president of the franchise, said Miller is "a type of guy that comes around every 10 years". On July 28, 2011, Miller signed his rookie contract. He wore number 58 in honor of Pro Football Hall of Fame linebacker Derrick Thomas.

2011 season 

On September 12, 2011, in his first career play from scrimmage, Miller forced a fumble against the Oakland Raiders. On September 18, 2011, he had his first sack on Andy Dalton when the Broncos played the Cincinnati Bengals.

Miller was named the AFC Defensive Player of the Week for his Week 11 performance against the New York Jets. The Broncos made the playoffs and faced off against the Pittsburgh Steelers in the Wild Card Round. In his playoff debut, Miller had three solo tackles and one quarterback hit in the 29–23 overtime victory. In the Divisional Round against the New England Patriots, he had two quarterback hits in the 45-10 loss.

Miller was selected to the 2012 Pro Bowl and was named AP Defensive Rookie of the Year. Overall, in 907 snaps, he recorded 11.5 sacks, 19 quarterback hits and 29 quarterback hurries. He was fined three times during the season. He was ranked 52nd by his fellow players on the NFL Top 100 Players of 2012.

2012 season 

Miller got off to a quick start in his second season, registering 10 sacks in nine games. In this period, he recorded 30 quarterback hurries, more than he had during his entire 2011 campaign. Thanks to this tremendous start, he was considered an MVP candidate. On November 16, he was fined $21,000 for a hit on Carolina Panthers quarterback Cam Newton in week 10. He received his second career AFC Defensive Player of the Week honor after recording three sacks and two forced fumbles against the San Diego Chargers the following week. For his efforts during November, he was awarded AFC Defensive Player of the Month. On December 26, 2012, he was announced the starting outside linebacker in the AFC division for the 2013 Pro Bowl. He also capped off the 2012 season finishing second in voting for Defensive Player of the Year and being named first-team All-Pro. In the Divisional Round of the playoffs, Miller had nine total tackles and two quarterback hits in the 38–35 2OT loss to the Baltimore Ravens.

In 2012, Miller teamed up with Ubisoft, makers of the video game The Hip Hop Dance Experience, to create his own sack celebration dance called the "DeSoto Shuffle" that was inspired by the video game.  Each time he performed the dance during a game, Ubisoft made a charitable donation to Von's Vision, a foundation devoted to providing eye care and glasses to underprivileged youth. He was ranked 9th by his fellow players on the NFL Top 100 Players of 2013.

2013 season 

In July 2013, ESPN reported that Miller had been suspended four games for violating league policy, pending appeal. He tweeted that he did "nothing wrong". In August 2013, he lost the appeal and was suspended for six games. The six-game suspension arose after the NFL learned that he attempted to cheat a drug test. He became eligible to play on October 20, 2013, when the Broncos played the Indianapolis Colts. On November 24, in a loss to the New England Patriots, he recovered a Stevan Ridley fumble and took it 60 yards for a touchdown. It was the second touchdown of his career. He did fairly well upon his return, but his season was ended prematurely when he suffered an anterior cruciate ligament injury (ACL) on December 22, 2013, during a win on the road at the Houston Texans. Without Miller, the Broncos reached Super Bowl XLVIII, but lost 43–8 to the Seattle Seahawks. He was ranked 76th by his fellow players on the NFL Top 100 Players of 2014.

2014 season 

After recovering from his ACL injury, Miller returned for his fourth season with the Broncos. Miller earned AFC Defensive Player of the Month for October. He recorded 14 sacks, 59 tackles, and a forced fumble. In the Divisional Round of the playoffs against the Indianapolis Colts, he had six total tackles and one quarterback hit in the 24–13 loss. He earned a Pro Bowl nomination for his 2014 season. He was ranked 33rd by his fellow players on the NFL Top 100 Players of 2015.

2015 season 

On September 17, 2015, Miller became the third-fastest player in NFL history to reach 50 career sacks (58 games). The only ones to get there faster than him were Reggie White (40 games) and Derrick Thomas (54). Overall, in the 2015 season, Miller finished with 11 sacks, 35 total tackles, 32 quarterback hits, one pass defended, and four forced fumbles.

In the Divisional Round against the Pittsburgh Steelers, he had two total tackles in the 23–16 victory. During the AFC Championship against the New England Patriots, Miller sacked Tom Brady  times, breaking a Broncos single-game playoff record and also had an interception in the second quarter of the game.

In Super Bowl 50, facing the heavily favored Carolina Panthers, who held the top-ranked offense, the Broncos won 24–10. In the first quarter, on a 3rd-and-10 from the 15-yard line, Miller knocked the ball out of Panthers quarterback Cam Newton's hands while sacking him, and defensive end Malik Jackson recovered it in the end zone for a Broncos touchdown, giving the team a 10–0 lead. This was the first fumble return touchdown in a Super Bowl since Super Bowl XXVIII. With 4:51 left in regulation and the Broncos leading 16–10, Miller forced a second fumble from Newton to end the Panthers' potential game-winning drive, and the Broncos offense afterwards scored a touchdown to seal the victory. Miller recorded six tackles,  sacks, two forced fumbles, and two quarterback hurries, and was named Super Bowl MVP for his performance.

Miller was named to his fourth Pro Bowl, earned his second first-team All-Pro, and was ranked 15th by his fellow players on the NFL Top 100 Players of 2016.

2016 season 

On March 1, 2016, the Broncos placed the exclusive franchise tag on Miller. On July 15, Miller signed a 6-year deal worth $114.5 million featuring $70 million guaranteed with the Broncos. He became the highest-paid defensive player in NFL history, with the highest guaranteed salary.

Miller earned AFC Defensive Player of the Week for week 2 against the Indianapolis Colts. He earned AFC Defensive Player of the Month for September. Miller finished the 2016 regular season with  sacks and 24 quarterback hits. In the last four games of the season, Miller did not record a sack, which was the longest such stretch in his career. He was named to his fifth career and third consecutive Pro Bowl, and his third first-team All-Pro, and was ranked second by his fellow players on the NFL Top 100 Players of 2017 as the highest ranked defensive player.

2017 season 

On December 19, 2017, Miller was named to his sixth Pro Bowl. Miller was named the 2018 Pro Bowl defensive MVP. In the 2017 season, he recorded his fourth consecutive season with at least 10 sacks. He was ranked ninth by his fellow players on the NFL Top 100 Players of 2018.

2018 season 

In the Broncos' 2018 season opener against the Seattle Seahawks, Miller recorded three sacks and seven total tackles in the 27–24 victory. In week 11, Miller intercepted Philip Rivers and returned it 42 yards to set up a touchdown, which helped ignite a 23-22 comeback win over the Los Angeles Chargers, earning him AFC Defensive Player of the Week.

During the 2018 season, Miller recorded his 100th career sack (including postseason sacks), becoming the fifth-fastest player in NFL history to do so. He was also selected to the 2019 Pro Bowl as a starting outside linebacker, which was his seventh career and fifth consecutive Pro Bowl. He was ranked 10th by his fellow players on the NFL Top 100 Players of 2019.

2019 season 

In week 4 against the Jacksonville Jaguars, Miller sacked Gardner Minshew twice in the 26-24 loss. Miller's second sack of the game was the 100th sack of his career.

He was also selected to the 2020 Pro Bowl as a starting outside linebacker, which was his eighth career and sixth consecutive Pro Bowl. He was ranked 26th by his fellow players on the NFL Top 100 Players of 2020. He was named to the Pro Football Hall of Fame All-Decade Team for the 2010s.

2020 season 

During practice on September 8, 2020, Miller suffered what was called a “freak injury near the ankle”, and season-ending surgery was feared to be required. An MRI the next day revealed that the injury was a dislocated peroneal tendon, and Miller was subsequently placed on injured reserve.

2021 season 

In March 2021, the Broncos exercised the 2021 year option in Miller's contract. His contract, which entered its final year, guarantees $7 million of his base salary of $17.5 million in 2021.

Miller recorded  sacks and 17 tackles in six games. Miller earned AFC Defensive Player of the Month for September. He sprained his ankle against the Cleveland Browns on October 21, 2021, which ended up being his final game as a Bronco.

Los Angeles Rams 

Miller was traded to the Los Angeles Rams in exchange for second- and third-round draft picks in the 2022 NFL Draft on November 1, 2021. At the time of the trade, Miller was the longest-tenured Bronco, and the only remaining nonspecial-teams player from Denver's Super Bowl 50 roster. In an emotional interview following his trade, Miller held back tears, saying, "I love Broncos Country. When I said 'Broncos for life,' I meant that. It was an honor and a privilege to play here.” Miller chose to wear number 40 for the Rams, his number at Texas A&M, with the familial blessing of Rams legend Elroy Hirsch, since his number 58 was taken by Justin Hollins.

In week 10, Miller made his Rams debut and tallied three tackles in a 31–10 loss to the San Francisco 49ers. In week 15, in a 20-10 home win, Miller notched his first sack as Ram against Seattle Seahawks quarterback Russell Wilson. In week 16, Miller recorded a sack against Kirk Cousins in a 30–23 road win over the Minnesota Vikings. In week 17, Miller had his best game as a Ram by notching two sacks and five tackles, including the game-sealing sack on Baltimore Ravens quarterback Tyler Huntley in the 20–19 victory. Overall in the 2021 season, Miller recorded 50 tackles,  sacks, one pass defended, and one forced fumble in 15 games played. Miller helped the Rams win Super Bowl LVI 23-20 against the Cincinnati Bengals. Miller recorded two sacks in the game. His multiple-sack performance makes him only the second player to ever have multiple Super Bowl games with multiple sacks. The other is Justin Tuck of the New York Giants. He also tied Charles Haley's record for most career Super Bowl sacks at  sacks, despite playing in three fewer Super Bowls than Haley. He was ranked 93rd by his fellow players on the NFL Top 100 Players of 2022.

Buffalo Bills

On March 16, 2022, Miller signed with the Buffalo Bills on a six-year, $120 million deal. In his debut with the team, he recorded two sacks, two QB hits, and three tackles for loss in a 31–10 Bills victory over his former team, the Los Angeles Rams in the NFL Kickoff Game. During a Thanksgiving Day game in Detroit against the Lions, Miller exited with an apparent knee injury. The next day, Miller was confirmed to be out for at least 2-4 weeks. He was placed on injured reserve on December 1, 2022. During exploratory surgery on his knee, Miller was found to have torn his ACL and would miss the remainder of the season.

NFL career statistics

Regular season

Postseason

Broncos franchise records
As of his departure from the team in 2021, Miller holds five Broncos franchise records for sacks, including:
 Career ( sacks)
 Single season ( in 2012)
 Playoff career
 Single playoff season (5 in 2015)
 Single playoff game ( on both January 24, 2016, against the New England Patriots in the AFC Championship and February 7, 2016, against the Carolina Panthers in Super Bowl 50)

NFL records
 Most sacks in the Super Bowl –  (50, LVI) (tied with Charles Haley)

Personal life
Miller was born in Dallas, Texas, to parents Von and Gloria Miller, and grew up in the Dallas suburb of DeSoto. His parents, who were both athletes in high school and college, own a power supply business.  He has a younger brother Vinsynzie "Vins". Having majored in poultry science at Texas A&M, Miller operates his own farm, raising chickens. In August 2013, Miller was arrested on a failure to appear warrant for driving-related charges in October 2012. In September 2013, Miller was cited for speeding and driving with a suspended license in Arapahoe County, Colorado. In April 2018, while on a guided fishing tour off the coast of Florida, Miller is alleged to have illegally landed and improperly caught and released a hammerhead shark. In April 2020, Miller was diagnosed with COVID-19, recovering from it by the following month.

Von's Vision Foundation 
In 2012, Miller created Von's Vision Foundation - generally referred to as "Von's Vision" - "to provide low-income students with eye care and fashionable corrective eyewear they need to be their best in the classroom and in life." As of 2019, the foundation is exclusively partnered with international eyewear retailer Etnia Barcelona to provide premium eyewear through the foundation’s twice annual “Vision Day” programs, during which students are also provided eye exams by local eyecare providers.

The ”Vision Day” is a two-day-long program. On the first day, students are given their eye exams and the opportunity to pick out their frames. On the second day – after the prescription lenses are produced for the frames - Miller hosts a party where the students have their frames fitted and are able to interact with him personally. Von's Vision began hosting their "Vision Days" for low-income students in the Denver Public Schools - as Miller was then a player for the Denver Broncos - and has since expanded to hosting the program for students at Texas A&M University - Miller's alma mater. Also, at Texas A&M University and multiple locations in Colorado, Von's Vision has launched its "Von's Vision Centers", which are "mobile optometry kiosks that allow in-need students to receive vision care on an ongoing basis without the burden of transportation" - and "Von's Lockers" - which "like the Vision Centers, offer a permanent fixture that gets students brand-new prescription glasses without the burden of transportation. Von’s Lockers allow students who already have accurate prescriptions to easily select a new pair of glasses, bypassing the screenings and exams."

As a result of his charitable contributions and impact - along with his leadership on the team and in the Denver community - the Broncos gave him their nomination for the Walter Payton NFL Man of the Year Award.

In popular culture
Miller was referenced in South Park during the season-20 episode "Oh, Jeez", when Gerald Broflovski is sent to Denmark under the alias "Ambassador Von Miller"; this has been one of the show's numerous references to the Broncos, as many characters living in the series's titular town are fans of the team.

On March 8, 2016, Miller was announced as one of the celebrities who would compete on season 22 of Dancing with the Stars. He was partnered with professional dancer Witney Carson. On May 2, 2016, during a double elimination, Miller and Carson were eliminated and finished the competition in eighth place.

During a Celebrity Wheel of Fortune episode aired January 30, 2022 (the same date Miller's Rams played in the 2021-22 NFC Championship Game), Miller won the minimum $30,000 for his selected charity, Von’s Vision.

References

External links

 
 Buffalo Bills bio
 Texas A&M Aggies bio
 NFL combine profile
 

1989 births
Living people
100 Sacks Club
African-American players of American football
All-American college football players
American Conference Pro Bowl players
American football defensive ends
American football linebackers
Buffalo Bills players
Denver Broncos players
Gaming YouTubers
Los Angeles Rams players
National Football League Defensive Rookie of the Year Award winners
People from DeSoto, Texas
Players of American football from Dallas
Players of American football from Denver
Sportspeople from the Dallas–Fort Worth metroplex
Super Bowl MVPs
Texas A&M Aggies football players
Unconferenced Pro Bowl players
Video game commentators
YouTubers from Texas
20th-century African-American sportspeople